CJPC-DT, virtual channel 18.1 (UHF digital channel 27), is a Noovo-affiliated television station licensed to Rimouski, Quebec, Canada. It is a semi-satellite of Rivière-du-Loup-licensed CFTF-DT which is owned by Télé Inter-Rives. CJPC-DT's studios are located on Rue Saint Germain and Avenue de la Cathédrale (near the shoreline of the Saint Lawrence River) in Rimouski, and its transmitter is located on Avenue de la Cathédrale (near Highway 20). On cable, the station is available on Cogeco channel 5.

The station was launched in 1987, originally relaying the signal from CFJP-TV in Montreal. On June 1, 2007, the CRTC approved a joint application by TQS and Télé Inter-Rives to convert the TQS station in Rimouski, CJPC-TV, from a transmitter of CFJP Montreal to a transmitter of CFTF-TV in Rivière-du-Loup. As part of the deal, a news bureau would be built in Rimouski, and a limited amount of local programming would be added on CJPC.

External links
CFTF 

JPC
JPC
Television channels and stations established in 1986
1986 establishments in Quebec